Waverly Junior and Senior High School, also known as Mary W. Muldoon High School, is a historic school located at Waverly in Tioga County, New York.  It is a three-story brick building with an attached two story wing on a solid concrete foundation built in 1913.  The most dominant feature of the building is the entryway.  It features a round headed archway flanked by cast stone Roman Doric columns and surmounted by a wide entablature with balustrade.  It ceased being used as a school in 1967 and, for a period, was used for administrative offices for the system. It is now a 55+ apartment building called Muldoon Garden Apartments.

It was listed on the National Register of Historic Places in 1997.

References

School buildings on the National Register of Historic Places in New York (state)
School buildings completed in 1913
Schools in Tioga County, New York
1913 establishments in New York (state)
National Register of Historic Places in Tioga County, New York